Stoer is a crofting township in the parish of Assynt, Sutherland, in the Highlands of Scotland and in the council area of Highland. It is located about five miles north of the village of  Lochinver.

Norman McLeod, a presbyterian minister who led a group of emigrants to Nova Scotia and New Zealand, came from Stoer.

The Old Man of Stoer, a sea stack, and the lighthouse on Stoer Head are directly accessible from Stoer, being less than 4 miles north/north west of the village.

Rev Farquhar Matheson, minister of the parish from 1920, served as Moderator of the General Assembly of the Free Church of Scotland in 1939.

References

Populated places in Sutherland